Randall Jeffrey O'Neal (born August 30, 1960) is a former American college and professional baseball player who was a pitcher in Major League Baseball (MLB) during seven seasons. He played at the major league level for the Detroit Tigers, Atlanta Braves, St. Louis Cardinals, Philadelphia Phillies and San Francisco Giants.

Early life
O'Neal was born in Ashland, Kentucky.  He attended Palm Beach Community College in West Palm Beach, Florida, and then accepted an athletic scholarship to transfer to the University of Florida in Gainesville, Florida, where he played for the Florida Gators baseball team in 1981.  During his single season as a Gator, he led the pitching staff with 108 innings pitched and nine complete games—including one in the SEC Tournament and another in the NCAA Tournament.  He was an SEC All-Tournament selection.

Career
The Detroit Tigers selected O'Neal in the first round (15th pick) of the secondary phase of the 1981 amateur draft.  O'Neal played his first professional season with their Class A-Advanced Lakeland Tigers in 1981, and his last season with the Kansas City Royals' Double-A Memphis Chicks in 1991.

O'Neal made his MLB debut with the Detroit Tigers in 1984, and he played for the Tigers until 1986, compiling a win–loss record of 10–13 in twenty-six starts.  He also pitched two complete games for the Tigers, as well as three saves in relief.  After being traded by the Tigers, he became a journeyman middle reliever, playing for the Atlanta Braves, St. Louis Cardinals, Philadelphia Phillies and San Francisco Giants in succession.  He finished his seven-season MLB career having played in 142 games with a record of 17–19.

See also 

 Florida Gators
 List of Florida Gators baseball players

External links

1960 births
Living people
Atlanta Braves players
Baseball players from Kentucky
Birmingham Barons players
Corpus Christi Barracudas players
Detroit Tigers players
Evansville Triplets players
Florida Gators baseball players
Lakeland Tigers players
Louisville Redbirds players
Major League Baseball pitchers
Memphis Chicks players
Nashville Sounds players
Palm Beach State Panthers baseball players
Philadelphia Phillies players
Phoenix Firebirds players
Richmond Braves players
San Francisco Giants players
San Jose Giants players
Scranton/Wilkes-Barre Red Barons players
St. Louis Cardinals players